Cumhuriyet is a village in the Kâhta District, Adıyaman Province, Turkey. The village is populated by Kurds of the Mirdêsî tribe and had a population of 865 in 2021.

References 

Villages in Kâhta District

Kurdish settlements in Adıyaman Province